Dwayne Lamore Fontana (born 21 February 1973) is an American former basketball player. He played college basketball for Arizona State before going on to play professionally. In 2001, he was the leading scorer of the Icelandic Úrvalsdeild.

High school career
Fontana attended Riordan High in San Francisco where he played basketball.

College career
Fontana played four years for Arizona State, averaging 10.1 points and 5.9 rebounds over his career. During his senior year the University was rocked by a point-shaving scandal involving teammates Hedake Smith and Isaac Burton. He was interviewed in the Netflix series Bad Sport about his teammates' involvement.

Professional career
In September 2000, Fontana signed with Úrvalsdeild karla club KFÍ. On 13 October he scored a season high 48 points against Valur/Fjölnir. On 21 February, he grabbed 15 offensive rebounds against Njarðvík. For the season, Fontana averaged a league leading 33.0 points and 13.9 rebounds per game.

Following his stay in Iceland, Fontana played shortly in Spain and Luxembourg before retiring from basketball.

References

External links
College statistics at Sports Reference
Úrvalsdeild statistics at Icelandic Basketball Association
Profile at Eurobasket.com

1973 births
Living people
American expatriate basketball people in Iceland
American expatriate basketball people in Luxembourg
American expatriate basketball people in Spain
American men's basketball players
Arizona State Sun Devils men's basketball players
Forwards (basketball)
Dwayne Fontana
Dwayne Fontana